Emperor Taizu of Zhou may refer to:

 Guo Wei (904–954), who in 951 founded a dynasty called Zhou (known in history as Later Zhou)
 Wu Sangui (1612–1678), who in 1678 founded a rebel dynasty called Zhou

See also
 Taizu (disambiguation)
 Zhou (disambiguation)